Kochánky is a municipality and village in Mladá Boleslav District in the Central Bohemian Region of the Czech Republic. It has about 500 inhabitants.

Notable people
František Šťastný (1927–2000), motorcycle road racer

References

Villages in Mladá Boleslav District